John Corfield (1893–1953) was a British film producer. For more than a decade he oversaw production at British National Films.

Selected filmography
 Turn of the Tide (1935)
 Debt of Honour (1936)
 Mr. Reeder in Room 13 (1938)
 Meet Mr. Penny (1938)
 Lassie from Lancashire (1938)
 Night Journey (1938)
 Secret Journey (1939)
 Dead Men Tell No Tales (1939)
 What Would You Do, Chums? (1939)
 Old Mother Riley Joins Up (1939)
 Contraband (1940)
 The Second Mr. Bush (1940)
 Gaslight (1940)
 He Found a Star (1941)
 One of Our Aircraft Is Missing (1942)
 Headline (1944)

References

External links

1893 births
1953 deaths
Film people from Liverpool
British film producers